Route 303 is provincial secondary highway located in the Outaouais region in western Quebec. The 47-kilometer route in the Pontiac County runs from Portage-du-Fort (near the Ontario-Quebec crossing towards Renfrew County) towards Otter Lake at the junction of Route 301.

Municipalities along Highway 303
 Portage-du-Fort
 Clarendon
 Shawville
 Thorne
 Otter Lake

Major intersections

See also
 List of Quebec provincial highways

References

External links 
 Official Transport Quebec Road Map 
 Route 303 on Google Maps

303